Trayvon is a male given name.

Notable people

Trayvon Bromell (born 1995), American track and field athlete
Trayvon Henderson (born 1995), American football player
Trayvon Lathan (born 1984), American basketball player
Trayvon Martin (1995–2012), American social figure
Trayvon Mullen (born 1997), American football player
Trayvon Palmer (born 1994), American basketball player
Trayvon Reed (born 1995), American basketball player
Trayvon Robinson (born 1987), American baseball player
TrayVonn Wright (born 1991), American basketball player

See also

Travon, a page for people with the given name "Travon"
Trevon, a page for people with the given name "Trevon"

African-American given names